Stephen Edred Flowers, commonly known as Stephen E. Flowers, and also by the pen-names Edred Thorsson, and Darban-i-Den, is an  American runologist, university lecturer, and proponent of occultism, especially of Neo-Germanic paganism and Odinism. He helped establish the Germanic Neopagan movement in North America and has also been active in left-hand path occult organizations. He has over three dozen published books and hundreds of published papers and translations on a disparate range of subjects.

Early life and education
Stephen Edred Flowers was born in Bonham, Texas, the only son of Betty Jane Eden, daughter of Edred Cosgrove Eden (1888-1945). In 1960 his family moved to Dallas. Flowers attended the Bryan Adams High School (class of 1971).

In the summer of 1974 Flowers moved to Austin and did his graduate work in Germanic and Celtic philology under professor and scholar Edgar Polomé at the University of Texas at Austin from 1973 to 1984.

In May 1979 he received an M.A. degree with a thesis entitled "Rebirth and Rites of Transformation in the Saga of Sigurðr Sigmundarson" (later released on a limited basis within the Rune-Gild under the title "Sigurðr, Rebirth and Initiation, and republished as “Sigurðr: Rebirth and the Rites of Transformation" in 2015).

In 1981-1982 he studied academic runology at the University of Göttingen, Germany under Klaus Düwel.

Flowers received his Ph.D. in Germanic Languages and Medieval Studies in 1984 with a dissertation entitled Runes and Magic: Magical Formulaic Elements in the Elder Tradition.

Academic career
Flowers began his career as a university lecturer. From 1984 to 1989 he was a lecturer in the departments of English and Germanic Languages at the University of Texas. Flowers was last known to be teaching classes in the Humanities at Austin Community College.

Occult career 

 
In June 1974, while riding in the backseat of a car from Houston to Austin, Flowers says that he heard the sound roonah. He said that the experience was the first milestone in his journey. In 1978 Flowers joined the Asatru Free Assembly (old AFA) where he was one of the earliest members, with membership number 072.

In May 1979 he founded the Austin "skeppslag" (later kindred) of the AFA. In 1980 he was initiated as a goði by Stephen A. McNallen. In Yule-Tide 1979/80 Flowers founded the Rune-Gild, an initiatory order focused on "the revival of the elder Runic" tradition, advocating runic magic.

On November 11, 1983, he founded a small group to explore what he saw as the dark, futuristic undercurrent of Odinism called The Order of Shining Trapezohedron or "O.S.T." (Order of the Shining Trapezoid) which closed on January 13, 1984.

In February 1984 he became a member of the Temple of Set, being recognized to the Second Degree of Adept and to the Priesthood (III°) on October 7, 1984. On November 14, 1986, he was recognized as a Magister Templi (IV°). In November 1987 the AFA (old AFA) collapsed, and on December 20, Thorsson founded the Ring of Troth.

The leadership fell to James Allen Chisholm, with Thorsson remaining as a spiritual advisor. In 1989 a man named Robert Meek and others began a campaign against Thorsson, “exposing” him of practicing dark arts and being a member of the Temple of Set, although this was well known within the Asatru community and was never a secret. It was also during this time that the 18-year ban on manifestation of the Order of the Triskelion (Triskelenorden) was lifted - an organization for the practice of operant Sadeanism and Carnal Alchemy, founded in early 1991 by Thorsson and Dawn.

In March 1992 the administrative power of the Ring of Troth was handed over to Prudence Priest and a full contingency of Rede members by Chisholm, which gave Thorsson the ability to spend most of his time to matters pertaining to the Rune-Gild. In 1993 Thorsson and Dawn bought 30 acres of wilderness east of Austin and adjacent to Buescher State Park, named Woodharrow, on which the future history of the Gild and of the many of Thorsson's many other undertakings would be written. At the end of 1993 they moved to Woodharrow and over the next two years built up the physical facilities on the land where a meeting hall was erected and completed in 1996.

In 1993 the publishing company Rûna-Raven Press formerly began and continued to develop over the years. In the Spring of 1995, due to inner turmoil, Thorsson withdrew from any involvement with the Ring of Troth. In August 1995 he and Dawn traveled to Iceland and England to strengthen the work of the Rune-Gild. In April 1996 Thorsson retired from his position as Grand Master of the Order of the Trapezoid in order to focus more intently on Rune-Gild matters.

Works

As co-author

As editor

References

External links 
Official home page, archive of 28 July 2021

1953 births
Living people
Adherents of Germanic neopaganism
American modern pagans
American occultists
Founders of modern pagan movements
Germanic studies scholars
Modern pagan writers
Pseudonymous writers
Runologists
Setians
Writers on Germanic paganism